Mary Maples Dunn (April 6, 1931 – March 19, 2017) was an American historian. She served as the eighth president of Smith College for ten years beginning in 1985.  Dunn was also the director of the Schlesinger Library from 1995 to 2000. She was acting president of Radcliffe College when it merged with Harvard University, and she became the acting dean of the newly created Radcliffe Institute for Advanced Study after the merger. 

Dunn later became a Radcliffe Institute Fellow and served as co-executive officer of the American Philosophical Society from 2002 to 2007.

Early life and education
Mary Maples was born on April 6, 1931 in Sturgeon Bay, Wisconsin to Eva Moore Maples and Frederic Maples, who owned a clothing store. She was the second of four children and the only daughter.  While in Wisconsin, she attended a two-room school house.  Her father joined the Army during World War II where he remained as an officer after the war, retiring as a Colonel As a result, the family was stationed in multiple bases around the United States and China.

Career
Dunn's scholarship was focused primarily on William Penn, Pennsylvania, and the history of English-speaking colonies in the Mid-Atlantic region of what, following the American Revolutionary War, became the United States. She was a history professor at Bryn Mawr College in Bryn Mawr, Pennsylvania, where she taught an innovative interdisciplinary course in Latin American Studies in the mid-1970s.

The Mary Maples Dunn Prize, established in 2008 honors "the best article in early American women’s history by an untenured scholar published in William and Mary Quarterly that uses gender as a primary analytical category".

Personal life
In 1960, she married Richard Slator Dunn, a scholar of American colonial history at the University of Pennsylvania, an Ivy League university in Philadelphia. They had two daughters and three grandchildren from their 56 years together. Dunn remained a great traveler for the rest of her life. She and her husband were in Cairo during the Egyptian Revolution of 2011 in Tahrir Square  “It was surreal,” describes Dunn “We could see it all. There we were on this elegant terrace, comfortably viewing it all… That’s the only word for it—surreal.” “We had wandered into a war,” she says. “It was very clear that this was historic. We had CNN on all the time, and had access to Al Jazeera." "And so we witnessed history in the making. It was an unusual experience, and an amazing opportunity. We are glad to be at home, but are feeling the greatest sympathy for the Egyptians, and maybe a little optimistic about their chances for a better regime and a reduction in the misery so many of them experience every day."

Selected works

Books
William Penn: Classical Republican (Philadelphia: Historical Society of Pennsylvania, 1957)
William Penn: Politics and Conscience (Princeton University Press, 1967) 
Women of America: A Teacher’s Guide (Continental Press, 1976)
The World of William Penn (University of Pennsylvania Press, 1986), co-edited with Richard S. Dunn
The Papers of William Penn, (University of Pennsylvania Press, 1981–87) 5 volumes; co-edited with Richard S. Dunn  |  |  | 
The Personality of William Penn(Philadelphia: American Philosophical Society, 1983)
Recipes from the Inauguration of Mary Maples Dunn As the Eighth President of Smith College, September 1985, Northampton, Massachusetts. Northampton, (Mass: Marilyn Nelson and the Committee for the Inauguration, 1985) Co-authored with Julia Child.

Articles
"Flawed Biographies," The Virginia Quarterly Review 51.3 (1975): 483–486 
“Saints and Sisters: Congregational and Quaker Women in the Early Colonial Period,” American Quarterly Vol. 30, No. 5, Special Issue: Women and Religion (Winter, 1978): 582–601 
"Who Is This William Penn Person, Anyway?" Today, the Inquirer Magazine (n.d.): 22–24. Co-authored with Katz, Barbara J, Richard S. Dunn
"Dialogue: Paradigm Shift Books: A Midwife's Tale by Laurel Thatcher Ulrich," Journal of Women's History 14.3 (2002): 133–139

Book reviews
"Book Review: Edward Randolph and the American Colonies, 1676–1703," The Journal of Southern History 27.2 (1961): 242–244
"Book Review: Religion in American Life," The William and Mary Quarterly 19.1 (1962): 123–127. Co-authored with Richard S. Dunn
"Book Review: the King & the Quaker: a Study of William Penn and James Ii," The Pennsylvania Magazine of History and Biography 87.1 (1963): 89–90
"Book Review: William Penn the Politician: His Relations with the English Government," Quaker History 55.1 (1966): 56–57
"Book Review: Liberty and Authority: Early American Political Ideology, 1689–1763," The Journal of American History 56.4 (1970)
"Book Review: Benjamin Rush: Revolutionary Gadfly," The American Historical Review 78.1 (1973): 156–157
"Book Review: William Penn and Early Quakerism." The William and Mary Quarterly. 32.2 (1975): 344. 
"Book Review: Weathering the Storm: Women of the American Revolution." The Journal of Southern History. 42.3 (1976): 421–422

Notable students and protegees 
Drew Gilpin Faust, president emeritus, Harvard University
Mary Beth Norton, the Mary Donlon Alger Professor of American History and Stephen H. Weiss Presidential Fellow at Cornell University

Honors 
 Dunn was the recipient of the Radcliffe Medal in 2001
The Mary Maples Dunn Prize for early American women’s scholarship at the Omohundro Institute of Early American History and Culture
The Mary Maples and Richard S. Dunn Fund at the American Philosophical Society

Fellowships 
Source:

Fulbright scholar
American Council of Learned Societies
National Endowment for the Humanities
Institute for Advanced Study in Princeton, New Jersey

Honorary degrees 
Source:

Smith College
Amherst College
Brown University 
Lafayette College 
Marietta College
Haverford College
College of William and Mary
Transylvania University 
University of Pennsylvania

References

External links 
Office of the President Mary Maples Dunn files at the Smith College Archives, Smith College Special Collections

1931 births
2017 deaths
20th-century American historians
21st-century American historians
20th-century American women writers
21st-century American women writers
American women historians
Bryn Mawr College alumni
Historians from Wisconsin
Members of the American Philosophical Society
People from Sturgeon Bay, Wisconsin
Presidents of Smith College
Radcliffe fellows
Women heads of universities and colleges